Saas im Prättigau is a Swiss village in the Prättigau and a former municipality in the district of Prättigau/Davos in the canton of Graubünden. On 1 January 2016 the former municipality of Saas im Prättigau merged into the municipality of Klosters-Serneus.

History
Saas is first mentioned about 1290 as Säusch.

Geography

 
Of this area, 44% is used for agricultural purposes, while 26.2% is forested. Of the rest of the land, 2.1% is settled (buildings or roads) and the remainder (27.7%) is non-productive (rivers, glaciers or mountains).

The municipality is located in the Küblis sub-district of the Prättigau/Davos district.  It consists of the linear village of Saas on a terrace over the Prättigau valley, between Küblis and Klosters.

Neighboring municipalities

Coat of arms
The town coat of arms is described as Or a Wild Man holding over his shoulder a Club Vert.  The Wild man motif comes from the seal of the League of the Ten Jurisdictions as well as from Klosters and has been part of the municipality's coat of arms since the 16th Century.  The figure is always shown with a club over his shoulder, to prevent confusion with other Wild Men.

Demographics
, 10.0% of the population was made up of foreign nationals. Over the last 10 years the population has decreased at a rate of -3.8%. Most of the population speaks German (97.3%), with Portuguese being second most common ( 1.0%) and Romansh being third ( 0.4%).

, the gender distribution of the population was 51.1% male and 48.9% female.  The age distribution, in Saas is; 97 children or 13.2% of the population are between 0 and 9 years old and 76 teenagers or 10.4% are between 10 and 19.  Of the adult population, 94 people or 12.8% of the population are between 20 and 29 years old.  110 people or 15.0% are between 30 and 39, 97 people or 13.2% are between 40 and 49, and 93 people or 12.7% are between 50 and 59.  The senior population distribution is 80 people or 10.9% of the population are between 60 and 69 years old, 56 people or 7.6% are between 70 and 79, there are 26 people or 3.5% who are between 80 and 89 there are 4 people or 0.5% who are between 90 and 99.

In the 2007 federal election the most popular party was the SVP which received 54.7% of the vote.  The next three most popular parties were the FDP (24.2%), the SP (10.5%) and the local, small right-wing parties (7.1%).

In Saas about 71.3% of the population (between age 25-64) have completed either non-mandatory upper secondary education or additional higher education (either university or a Fachhochschule).

Saas has an unemployment rate of 0.77%.  , there were 66 people employed in the primary economic sector and about 26 businesses involved in this sector.  51 people are employed in the secondary sector and there are 11 businesses in this sector.  84 people are employed in the tertiary sector, with 26 businesses in this sector.

The historical population is given in the following table:

References

External links

 Official Web site 

Klosters-Serneus
Former municipalities of Graubünden